The National Archives of Malaysia is a Malaysian archive located in Kuala Lumpur.

History 
The National Archives of Malaysia were established in 1957 as the Public Records Office before changing to their current name in 1963. They established their current location in Jalan Duta in 1982. The National Archives Act 2003 (Act 629) was passed in 2003, providing the legislative basis for the National Archives of Malaysia for branch of archive.

See also 
 List of national archives

References

External links 
 National Archives of Malaysia

Federal ministries, departments and agencies of Malaysia
Malaysia
Government agencies established in 1957
1957 establishments in Malaya
Malaysian culture
Archives in Malaysia
Ministry of Tourism, Arts and Culture (Malaysia)